This is a list of counties in Scotland, ordered by population as at the 1971 census.

See also
List of counties of Scotland 1890–1975

References
1971 census

1971 United Kingdom census
1971 in Scotland